Concord Mall, a shopping mall located north of the city of Wilmington in the unincorporated Brandywine Hundred area along U.S. Route 202, is Delaware's second-largest shopping mall. A short distance south of the Pennsylvania border, it attracts shoppers from Pennsylvania and other neighboring states wishing to take advantage of tax-free shopping in Delaware. The mall contains over 90 stores and features a fountain surrounded by a garden.  It is owned by Namdar Realty Group. The mall anchors are Macy's, Macy's Home, and Boscov's.

Location
The Concord Mall is located in an unincorporated area of northern New Castle County, Delaware north of the city of Wilmington and a short distance south of the Pennsylvania border. The mall is situated along U.S. Route 202 (Concord Pike), a stretch of highway lined with several businesses between Wilmington and the Pennsylvania border. The Concord Mall is just south of the intersection between US 202 and Delaware Route 92 (Naamans Road). Concord Mall is served by DART First State bus routes 2 and 61, which provide service to Wilmington via Concord Pike and Claymont via Naamans Road.

Description

The mall is anchored by a  Boscov's, a  Macy's, and a  Macy's Home. There is a vacant  space last occupied Sears. Smaller stores in the mall include H&M, Bath and Body Works, Foot Locker, and rue21. Dining options at the mall include Bonefish Grill, Grub Burger Bar and Rasa Sayang. Located adjacent to the mall is a strip mall consisting of Ulta Beauty, Sprouts Farmers Market, and Best Buy. The Concord Mall is a popular shopping destination for residents of the northern suburbs of Wilmington while also attracting shoppers from nearby Pennsylvania and New Jersey who wish to take advantage of tax-free shopping.

History
During planning stages the mall was called Devonshire Square Mall. The mall opened in stages over a period of several years. The first stage was an Almart, a now-defunct discounter, which opened in 1965. The mall opened in 1968. In 1971, a Pomeroy's (now-defunct department store chain) was added. The Almart later became a Jefferson Ward (Montgomery Ward-owned discounter) in 1984, and was then a Bradlees for a brief time until it was demolished for a Sears that opened on September 22, 1992. Strawbridge & Clothier was added as an anchor in 1983, relocating from Merchandise Mart. Pomeroy's closed in 1986 and was replaced with Boscov's. Strawbridge & Clothier Home Furnishings opened at the mall in 1994. The same year, Concord Mall underwent a renovation. Allied Properties acquired the Concord Mall in 1998. In 2005, Federated Department Stores purchased May Department Stores, the owners of Strawbridge's, and planned to convert several Strawbridge's locations to Macy's, including the store at Concord Mall. Strawbridge's and Strawbridge's Home Furnishings became Macy's and Macy's Home, respectively, in 2006.

The Concord Mall has seen an increase in the vacancy rate in recent years due to competition. In January 2020, with the mall at risk of foreclosure, Allied Properties sold the Concord Mall to Namdar Realty Group, a real estate firm that specializes in distressed shopping malls. On February 5, 2020, it was announced that Sears would be closing as part of a plan to close 31 stores nationwide. The store closed in April 2020. This was the last Sears location in Delaware.

References

External links

Official Website

Shopping malls in Delaware
Shopping malls established in 1965
Buildings and structures in New Castle County, Delaware
Tourist attractions in New Castle County, Delaware
Namdar Realty Group